Olsoniformes is a clade of dissorophoid temnospondyls. It includes the families Dissorophidae and Trematopidae. Most members of the clade were highly adapted to a terrestrial lifestyle. The clade was named in 2008 and is defined as the least inclusive clade containing Dissorophus multicinctus (a dissorophid) and Acheloma cumminsi (a trematopid) but not Amphibamus grandiceps, Micromelerpeton credneri, and Apateon pedestris. Olsoniforms share various features such as a stout and low ilium and a thin cultriform process.

Trematopids are known from the Late Carboniferous and the Early Permian of Europe and across much of North America, while dissorophids are primarily found in Early Permian deposits in the central United States, extending into the Middle-Late Permian in Eurasia.

Below is a cladogram from Schoch (2018) showing the phylogenetic position of Olsoniformes within the Dissorophoidea:

References

Carboniferous temnospondyls
Permian temnospondyls
Fossil taxa described in 2008
Olsoniforms